Portfolios with Purpose ("PwP") is a registered 501(c)(3) non-profit organization founded in 2011.  It is an annual virtual stock selection competition in which players of novice and professional experience pay a nominal entry-fee to choose a five-stock, long-term portfolio. The contestants with the top-performing portfolios over a 12-month period will direct the sum total of the collected entry-fees to the charitable cause of their choice; and have the opportunity of a meeting with one of the professional hedge fund managers.

Mission
Portfolios with Purpose is working to achieve universal
investment literacy through its new online program, the
PwP Academy. Completely free for student users the PwP
Academy brings together expert investors from the PwP
community with high school and university students from
around the world to teach the fundamentals of investment
finance in a whole new way. Anchored by PwP’s annual
Student Challenge contest, students are taught core
investing principles and encouraged to try out what
they’ve learned in a fun, risk-free environment.
The PwP Academy introduces students to stock market
fundamentals, teaches them how to invest confidently and
responsibly, and gives them the tools necessary to begin
investing in their own future. Besides gaining critical
investment knowledge students will also be encouraged
to choose a charity to support throughout the program, establishing the value of giving back early in their
professional journey.
We believe investment literacy is a critical component
for long term financial health and as such, investment
education should be universally accessible to students of
any background or field of study. Thanks to the support
of PwP’s sponsors, we are happy to offer this education
free of charge, and we work continuously with our mission
partners to make sure our program is available to those
who may benefit from it the most—especially young
female students or students of color who historically have
lacked access to a financial education. By equipping a
generation of students with the tools required for personal
financial wellbeing we hope to improve outcomes in
financial literacy.

Operations
Portfolios with Purpose is an all-volunteer, non-profit organization overseen by a board of directors. Competitor stock portfolios are tracked, and progress is calculated daily. The contest's financial audits are prepared by Deloitte, and player's entry-fees are held in escrow at JPMorgan Chase.  100% of entry-fees net of credit card service charges are donated to top three competitor's, chosen charitable causes.

Senior Management
Brett Waikart is the Executive Director and President.

Media Coverage
After a year-long trial period, the public announcement of Portfolios with Purpose was conducted on June 20, 2012.

On September 6, 2012 Portfolios with Purpose announced the start of public registration, and the participation of several major hedge fund players: David Einhorn, Dan Loeb, Leon Cooperman, and Karen Finerman on the CNBC Fast Money Halftime Report.

Asher's professional background and the history of the formation of Portfolios with Purpose is detailed along with other notable public figures in Forbes Magazine on December 1, 2012.

On December 19, 2013 Portfolios with Purpose announced the official launch of the 2014 Contest Year with several participating philanthropists. The Giving Pledge signatory Leon Cooperman, and Robin Hood Foundation board member David Einhorn both founding Portfolios with Purpose members announced their return to the contest. As well as James Dinan, Marc Lasry, Richard Pzena, and Doug Silverman.

History
Portfolios with Purpose hosted its first stock picking
contest for charity in 2013. 50 friends and family
came together to play this year-long contest with
each contestant building a fantasy stock portfolio and
selecting a charity to represent. Players “bought-in” to
the contest with an entry donation and competed to
win the combined donation pool for the charity of their
choice. As with every contest PwP manages, 100% of all
entry donations were passed on to the winning charities.
We had no idea this first contest would spark the
philanthropic spirit of an entire industry.
Fast forward to 2020 and our annual contests regularly
draw thousands of professional and amateur investors
who compete on behalf of their favorite charities.

References

External links
 
 Permian Investment Partners

Philanthropic organizations based in the United States
Financial markets
Charities based in New York City